I Ketut Gedé is a Balinese painter from the village of Singaraja, active at the end of the 19th century.


Works 
He is best known for his illustrations of mythological Hindu tales such as the Ramayana.

He produced numerous paintings for Herman Neubronner van der Tuuk in the 1880s and 1890s, and from 1905 onwards for W. O. J. Nieuwenkamp, who considered him to be the best classical painter of his time.

References

See also

Bibliography 
 
 

Balinese culture
Indonesian painters
19th-century painters
Religious painters
Mythological painters